MSC Cordoba is a container ship built in 2008 by the Daewoo Mangalia Heavy Industries in Mangalia, Romania and currently operated by Mediterranean Shipping Company S.A. She is the sixth ship delivered to the Swiss company in a series of 12 ordered. The  ship has a container capacity of 4,860 TEUs.

References

External links
MSC Cordoba

2007 ships
Container ships
Ships built in Romania
Cargo ships of Liberia